Wang Jun may refer to:

Political and military
Wang Jun (Jin dynasty) (王濬) (206–286), Chinese general of the Jin Dynasty
Wang Jun (Pengzu) (王浚 (彭祖)) (252–314), Chinese general of the Jin Dynasty, and governor of Youzhou
Wang Jun (Tang chancellor) (王晙) (died 732), Chinese chancellor of the Tang Dynasty
Wang Jun (Later Zhou chancellor) (王峻) (902–953), Chinese chancellor of the Later Zhou Dynasty
Wang Jun (politician) (王君) (born 1952), Chinese politician, party chief of Inner Mongolia, former governor of Shanxi
Wang Jun (born 1958) (王军), Chinese politician, Director of the State Administration of Taxation

Businessmen
Wang Jun (businessman) (王军) (born 1941), Chinese businessman, former executive of China International Trust and Investment Corporation
Wang Jun (scientist) (王俊) (born 1976), CEO of iCarbonX

Sportspeople
Wang Jun (table tennis) (王俊, born 1953), Chinese table tennis player
Wang Jun (basketball) (王军, born 1963), Chinese women's basketball player
Wang Jun (Paralympic athlete) (王君) (born 1990), female Chinese Paralympic athlete
Wang Jun (weightlifter) (born 1989), Chinese weightlifter

Association footballers
Wang Jun (footballer, born 1966) (王俊), coach of Chinese football club Tianjin Teda
Wang Jun (footballer, born 1976) (王军), former Chinese football player for Tianjin Teda
Wang Jun (footballer, born April 1990) (王君), Chinese football player for Dalian Aerbin
Wang Jun (footballer, born July 1990) (王军), Chinese football player for Guizhou Zhicheng

Others
Wang Jun (physician) (born 1963), Chinese surgeon